The Crew League(stylized TCL), also Crew League is an indoor street rules basketball league founded by hip hop mogul and actor Sean Combs and producer Elie Maroun for  Revolt TV streaming. The league consists of numerous teams whose rosters led by  hip hop artists. The artists lead teams that include both current NBAG League and former  Junior League, as well as streetball players, and Drew League alumni. The rules of The Crew League games contain deviations from the official rules of 5-on-5 basketball as administered by FIBA. Baskets are scored on one and two-point shots, and the games end on 21, with win-by-two rules.

History
Season 1 took place in 2021 on  Revolt TV. The games are hosted by  battle rapper  Nems as  floor reporter, along with play-by-play commentator and MC Buster Scher, founder of HoopsNation.

Rules
The current rules depart from regular full-court basketball in the following ways.

Teams 
Each team consists of five players and any numbers of substituted. Each team must have the captains in the game simultaneously, and subbed out at the same time.

See also
  Big3 FIREBALL3

Similar variations of other sports in the US 
 Street Basketball 
 3x3 (basketball)

References

External links

 The Crew League website
 Twitter
 

Basketball leagues in the United States
African Americans and sport
Sports leagues established in 2021
2021 establishments in the United States